Asif Aslam Farrukhi (16 September 1959  1 June 2020) was a Pakistani writer, translator, and literary critic active in both Urdu and English.

He was also a public health expert and polyglot. He translated books from English into Urdu, as well as from Sindhi to Urdu and English. His collections of vernacular Pakistani writers translated in English are considered critical anthologies. From 2000 to 2020, he was the editor and publisher of the acclaimed Urdu literary journal Dunyazad.

Early life
Asif Aslam was born in Karachi in 1959 to Dr Aslam Farrukhi, a Professor of Urdu at Karachi University, and his wife Taj Begum. He was the elder of two sons. He was educated at St Patrick's High School and D.J. Sindh Government Science College, and then went on to complete his MBBS degree at the Dow University of Health Sciences in 1984. He published his first book of short stories, using the name Asif Farrukhi, while still a student at Dow University in 1982. From 1988-1989, he completed a master's degree in public health at Harvard University.

Literary career
Asif Aslam is the author of six collections of short stories and two collections of critical essays in Urdu. He was also a prolific translator, from Sindhi and English to Urdu as well as from Urdu and Sindhi to English. He compiled several English anthologies of writing from Pakistan.

In 2000, he founded the bi-annual literary journal Dunyazad, intended to position new Urdu writing in conversation with global literature in translation. He also founded the Scheherazade Press in 1999 to showcase new writings in Urdu.

From 2010 to 2018 Farrukhi was the co-founder and organizer of the Karachi Literature Festival, in collaboration with the Oxford University Press and the British Council. Following creative differences, in 2019, he co-founded the Adab Literature Festival as an alternative literary space.

Public Health Career 
From 1985 to 1993, Farrukhi worked at the Aga Khan University's Community Health Services department under the supervision of the public health pioneer Prof. John H. Bryant. From 1994 to 2014, he was the Health and Nutrition Program Officer with UNICEF, Karachi. His international and cross-country travels in his professional capacity greatly informed his literary oeuvre.

In 2014, he joined the then newly-founded Habib University as Associate Professor of Urdu and Director of the Arzu Center for Regional Languages & Humanities. In 2016, he briefly served as Interim Dean of the University's School of Arts, Humanities & Social Sciences.

Awards 
 Tamgha-e-Imtiaz (Medal of Excellence) by the President of Pakistan in 2006
 Prime Minister's Literary Award by the Pakistan Academy of Letters in 1997

Death 
Farrukhi died suddenly from a cardiac arrest in Karachi on 1 June 2020. He had been a long-term diabetic.

References 

Pakistani writers
Pakistani scholars
Harvard School of Public Health alumni
Pakistani public health doctors
Pakistani translators
Dow Medical College alumni
St. Patrick's High School, Karachi alumni
Writers from Karachi
Recipients of Tamgha-e-Imtiaz
1959 births
2020 deaths
United Nations officials
Academic staff of Aga Khan University